Lazard is a French surname. Notable people with the surname include:

 Allen Lazard (born 1995), American football player
 Daniel Lazard (born 1941), French computer scientist
 Frédéric Lazard (1883–1948), chess master
 Gilbert Lazard (1920-2018), French linguist and Iranologist
 Gustave Lazard (1876–1949), French chess master, problemist and organizer
 Justin Lazard (born 1967), actor and model
 Luckner Lazard (1928–1998), Haitian painter and sculptor
 Michel Lazard (1924-1987), French mathematician who introduced Lazard's universal ring
 Naomi Lazard (born 1936), American poet
 Sasha Lazard, American singer
 Sidney H. Lazard (born 1930), American bridge player
 Simon Lazard (1828–1898), Franco-American banker 

French-language surnames